Barleria observatrix is a species of plant in the family Acanthaceae. It is endemic to Mauritius.  Its natural habitat is subtropical or tropical dry forests.

References

observatrix
Endemic flora of Mauritius
Critically endangered plants
Taxonomy articles created by Polbot